Akurgal ("Descendant of the Great Mountain" in Sumerian) was the second king (Ensi) of the first dynasty of Lagash. His relatively short reign took place in the first part of the 25th century BCE (circa 2464-2455 BCE), during the period of the archaic dynasties. He succeeded his father, Ur-Nanshe, founder of the dynasty, and was replaced by his son Eannatum.

Very little is known about his reign: only six inscriptions mention it. One of them reports that he built the Antasura of Ningirsu.

During his reign, a border conflict pitted Lagash against Umma, These borders between Umma and Lagash had been fixed in ancient times by Mesilim, king (lugal) of Kish, who had drawn the borders between the two states in accordance with the oracle of Ishtaran, invoked as intercessor between the two cities. Akurgal is mentioned fragmentally in an inscription on the Stele of the Vultures, describing the conflict of Akurgal with Lagash, possibly with Ush, king of Umma: "Because of […] the man of Umma spoke arrogantly with him and defied Lagash. Akurgal, king of Lagash, son of Urnanshe […]". In all likelihood Akurgal lost part of the territory of Lagash to the ruler of Umma.

He had two sons, who both became important rulers of Lagash after him, Eannatum and En-anna-tum I, and successfully repelled Umma's encroachment.

References

Kings of Lagash
25th-century BC Sumerian kings